Billboard Top R&B Records of 1949 is made up of two year-end charts compiled by Billboard magazine ranking the year's top rhythm and blues records based on record sales and juke box plays.

See also

Billboard year-end top 30 singles of 1949
1949 in music

References

1949 record charts
Billboard charts
1949 in American music